Biffontaine is a commune in the Vosges department in Grand Est in northeastern France.

History
In the World War II, it was liberated from German occupation by soldiers of the Japanese-American 442nd Regimental Combat Team in late October 1944, who then defended it from fierce counterattacks.  It is perhaps best known as being near the location of the rescue of the "Lost Battalion" of soldiers from 1st Battalion, 141st Regiment, 36th Infantry Division, who had been surrounded by German forces but were rescued by the 442nd.

See also
Communes of the Vosges department

References

Communes of Vosges (department)